The Curtis Cup is the best known team trophy for women amateur golfers, awarded in the biennial Curtis Cup Match. It is co-organised by the United States Golf Association and The R&A and is contested by teams representing the United States and "Great Britain and Ireland". The same two teams originally contested the Ryder Cup, but unlike that competition, the Curtis Cup has not widened the Great Britain and Ireland team to include all Europeans (nor has the analogous event for amateur men, the Walker Cup). Many women who have gone on to become stars of women's professional golf have played in the Curtis Cup.

History
The first Curtis Cup Match was played in 1932 at the Wentworth Club in England, and was won by the American team. The trophy, a silver bowl of Paul Revere design, was donated by Harriot Curtis (who had won the U.S. Women's Amateur in 1906) and her sister Margaret (who had won it in 1907, 1911, and 1912). In 1905 the Curtis sisters had competed in an informal match between teams of American and British golfers, and they wanted to promote the international friendships in the world of women's golf. The cup is inscribed, "To stimulate friendly rivalry among the women golfers of many lands."

The 1905 match was played at Royal Cromer Golf Club before the British Ladies Amateur Championship. The Amateur Championship started on Tuesday 30 May and it was originally planned to play the match on Monday 29 May, with a triangular competition between England, Scotland and Ireland being held from 25 to 27 May. Eventually the Britain/America match was played on 25 May with the triangular matches played on 26 and 27 May. The Britain/America match followed the same format as the triangular matches and involved seven 18-hole singles matches with extra holes played if necessary. The match resulted in a 6–1 win for the British team. Georgianna Bishop was the only American winner, beating Lottie Dod in the first match at the 20th hole. Margaret Curtis lost to May Hezlet while Harriot Curtis lost to Elinor Nevile.

An unofficial match was played at Sunningdale Golf Club on 1 May 1930. There were five foursomes matches followed by ten singles matches in the afternoon. The match was level after the foursomes, with each team winning two matches and one match halved. Britain won six of the ten singles matches to win the contest.

Discussions between various golf associations had been underway since 1924—the Curtis sisters had originally donated the trophy in 1927 to help these discussions along—but it was not until 1931 that the USGA and LGU agreed to co-sponsor the event. It was hoped that the French Golf Union would eventually participate, but that never occurred. The Curtis Cup Match is played every two years in even numbered years, alternating between the two sides of the Atlantic.
 
In 2004, then fourteen-year-old Michelle Wie played for the U.S. becoming the youngest player in Curtis Cup history. She won both of her singles matches. In 2010 Leona Maguire became the youngest player to represent Great Britain & Ireland when she played at the age of 15. In 2008 Stacy Lewis won all her five matches, a feat equalled by Bronte Law in 2016 and Kristen Gillman in 2018.  The scheduled 2020 event was postponed to 2021 due to the COVID-19 pandemic.

Format
The competition involves various match play matches between players selected from the two teams of 8, either singles, foursomes, or (starting in 2008) fourball. The winner of each match scores a point for their team, with  a point each for any match that is tied after 18 holes. If the entire Match is tied, the previously current holder retains the Cup.

A foursomes match is a competition between two teams of two golfers. The golfers on the same team take alternate shots throughout the match, with the same ball. Each hole is won by the team that completes the hole in the fewest shots. A fourball match is a competition between two teams of two golfers. All four golfers play their own ball throughout the round. Each hole is won by the team whose individual golfer had the lowest score. A singles match is a standard match play competition between two golfers.

The original format was to have three foursomes matches and six singles matches for a total of nine points. In 1932 and 1936 these were played in a single day but generally they were over two days. The early matches were played over 18 holes but some later matches were over 36 holes. 1964, the format was changed, with three foursomes and six singles matches each day, a total of 18 points. In 2008, the format changed to a three-day competition, with three foursomes and three fourball matches on each of the first two days, and eight singles matches on the final day, a total of 20 points. All matches since 1964 have been over 18 holes.

Results

Of the 42 contests through 2022, USA have won 31 matches, Great Britain and Ireland have won 8 with 3 matches tied (1936, 1958 and 1994).

Future sites 
 2024 – Sunningdale Golf Club, Berkshire, England
 2026 – Bel-Air Country Club, Bel Air, Los Angeles, California
 2030 – National Golf Links of America, Southampton, New York
 2038 – Bandon Dunes Golf Resort, Bandon, Oregon

See also
List of American Curtis Cup golfers
List of Great Britain and Ireland Curtis Cup golfers

Notes and references

External links
Official site

 
Amateur golf tournaments
Team golf tournaments
Women's golf tournaments
R&A championships
United States Golf Association championships